Lisa Jacqueline Coleman (born 10 July 1970) is an English actress best known for her television roles as Jude Korcanik in Casualty and Cam Lawson in The Story of Tracy Beaker (2002–2005). Coleman reprised the role in  Tracy Beaker Returns (2010–2012) and again in 2021 for My Mum Tracy Beaker and The Beaker Girls.

Career
Coleman was born in Hammersmith, London, and attended Anna Scher Theatre School at age six, going on to complete secondary education and A-levels. After working in television at various times since the early 1980s, in the mid-1990s she began a Bachelor's degree in Psychology with the UK Open University. She appeared in the BBC television drama series Casualty playing the character of staff nurse Jude Korcanik from September 1994 to February 1997. Her character survived a stabbing by a drug addict before moving to Crete.

In 1993 she modelled for Euan Uglow's painting Articulation, posing nude.

Her radio work includes a six-part series for the BBC in 1999, Old Dog and Partridge.

She attended her graduation ceremony in June 2005, and in a subsequent interview for the Open University's alumni magazine Sesame expressed her desire to continue working with the National Health Service and long-term aim to earn a Master of Arts degree.

Coleman is the sister of television and film actress Charlotte Coleman (1968–2001) and the younger daughter of Ann Beach (1938–2017) and Francis Coleman (1924–2008). 

Coleman is also a volunteer occupational therapist.

Filmography

Film

Television

Radio
Lisa in Afternoon Theatre: a home of our own (1980, Radio 4)
Emily in No Commitments
Nicola in Old Dog and Partridge

References

External links
 

1970 births
English television actresses
Living people
People from Hammersmith
Alumni of the Anna Scher Theatre School
Alumni of the Open University
20th-century English actresses
21st-century English actresses
English people of American descent
English people of Canadian descent
English child actresses